Elsa, l'essentiel 1986–1993 is a compilation album by French singer Elsa Lunghini. It was released in 1997.

Background and chart success 

The album contains songs from Elsa's first three albums : Elsa, Rien que pour ça and Douce violence. It contains all the songs released as singles, plus several titles that feature on the three studio albums and four cover versions in other languages of three of her hits from Elsa ("T'en va pas", "Jour de neige" and "Jamais nous").

The album met moderate success in Belgium where it was charted for ten weeks, from May 10 to July 19, 1997, peaking at #25 in its fourth week, but it was more successful in France, reaching #5 on the compilations chart and achieving Gold status.

Track listing

Charts

Certifications and sales

References

1997 greatest hits albums
Elsa Lunghini albums